The British Rail Class 77, also known as Class EM2, is a class of 1.5 kV DC, Co-Co electric locomotive. They were built by Metropolitan-Vickers in 1953–1954 for use over the Woodhead Line between Manchester and Sheffield.

Description
Seven locomotives of this type were constructed. They represented the first Co-Co type of overhead electric locomotive built for use in the United Kingdom. The design was based on that of the smaller Class EM1, which dated from 1941. Initially, 27 locomotives of this type had been planned, but by the early 1950s, the benefits of using the 25 kV AC system had been demonstrated, which meant that the Woodhead Line would be an isolated electric system. Consequently, the order was cut to just seven locomotives.

The locomotives were initially numbered 27000-27006 and were painted in BR black livery. Construction took place at Gorton Works, Manchester with electrical equipment supplied by Metropolitan-Vickers. All seven were named after characters from Greek mythology in 1959–1960. They were primarily used for express passenger trains between Manchester Piccadilly and Sheffield Victoria. In 1957, the class was renumbered with the addition of an "E" prefix to the number. In the early 1960s, the class started to receive the standard BR green livery. At least one of the class, E27002, received the electric blue livery carried by the AC electric locomotives.

The class was withdrawn en masse in September 1968. They were stored at Bury by BR in the hope of sale to a foreign railway. The passenger service for which the Class 77s were built continued to be operated by Class 76s, until its withdrawal on 5 January 1970. The Woodhead Line was closed as a through route in 1981, leaving just stubs between Manchester Piccadilly and Hadfield in the West and Sheffield Victoria and Deepcar in the East.

Forty more powerful 46 class electric locomotives were built by Metropolitan-Vickers in the mid-1950s for the New South Wales Government Railways. The 46 class was based on the EM1 and EM2.

Further use

In September 1969 the entire class was sold to the Dutch national railway operator Nederlandse Spoorwegen, where they became NS 1500 Class. They were renumbered in the 1500 series in the order they left their workshops, where they received various modifications, including new headlight clusters. The locomotives also retained their names.  One locomotive, no. E27005 Minerva was broken up and used for spares. The remaining six locomotives were employed until final withdrawal in 1985. Their main work was on The Hague—Cologne express trains as far as the border at Venlo although they travelled to their home depot at Maastricht either with a train or light engine on Sunday for their weekly examination before returning to traffic the following day. They were sometimes to be found on freight trains bound for the German border originating in the Rotterdam area.

Fleet details

References

Further reading

External links 

 Description of the class
 Website of the EM2 Society
 Website of the Werkgroep Loc 1501
 EM2 Page on the LNER Encyclopedia

77
Co-Co locomotives
Metropolitan-Vickers locomotives
1500 V DC locomotives
Preserved electric locomotives
Railway locomotives introduced in 1953
Standard gauge locomotives of Great Britain
Co′Co′ electric locomotives of Europe